The Early Bird is a 1925 American silent comedy film directed by Charles Hines and starring Johnny Hines, Sigrid Holmquist, and Wyndham Standing.

Plot
As described in a review in a film magazine, Jimmy Burke (Hines), independent milk man, changes clothes with a wealthy young chap who wants to put pep into a party, and, at the same time, party hostess Jean Blair (Holmquist) dresses as a maid. Jimmy takes a shine to her and invites her to a ride in his wagon and she accepts. George Fairchild (Standing), manager of the milk trust of which Jean is president, is pulling crooked business, and Jimmy gets on to him. Jimmy organizes the independent men and they make him president. Fairchild plans to buy him out. Jimmy learns that the supposed maid is Jean, and believes she was making fun of him. Jean discovers Fairchild’s crookedness and discharges him. She also gets wind of his plan to poison the independent’s supply, and sends a message to Jimmy who goes out and destroys the early deliveries. She goes to the plant and Fairchild’s aide (Barker) locks her in the refrigerating room. Jimmy arrives on the scene, fights the villain, and rescues Jean just as she is about to be killed by a machine used for cutting the ice. After this everything points to wedding bells for Jimmy and Jean.

Cast

Preservation
A complete print of The Early Bird is held in the Library of Congress and UCLA Film and Television Archive.

References

Bibliography
 Munden, Kenneth White. The American Film Institute Catalog of Motion Pictures Produced in the United States, Part 1. University of California Press, 1997.

External links

1925 films
1925 comedy films
Silent American comedy films
Films directed by Charles Hines
American silent feature films
1920s English-language films
American black-and-white films
1920s American films